Blackfriars school may refer to:
 Blackfriars Academy, Staffordshire, England
 Blackfriars Priory School, South Australia
 Llanarth Court, in Monmouthshire, Wales, which ran as Blackfriars School c.1948-1967.